Balbura fasciata is a moth of the subfamily Arctiinae. It is found in Central America, including Belize, Costa Rica, Guatemala, Mexico and Honduras.

References

Lithosiini